María José Loyola Anaya (born January 12, 1976), known professionally as María José is a Mexican singer, ballet and flamenco dancer, athlete and television personality. Her career started at age 15 when she joined the 90s famous Mexican band, Kabah as a vocalist. After leaving the band, in 2006, she continued her successful solo singing career and to date has released six studio albums.

Biography 
She has a B.A. in communications. She is well known and established within the music industry since she was part of a very popular pop-singing band in Mexico, Kabah, from the mid to late 1990s.

Her first experience on stage was at age 14 as a dancer in the Spanish Dance Company led by Maria Elena Anaya. She remained in the dance company participating with flamenco songs as well.

Career as a solo singer
During 2007, Maria Jose posed for the cover of MAX magazine, the equivalent of Maxim in the US.

She opened for Gwen Stefani's The Sweet Escape Tour in Mexico. This part of the tour included concerts in Arena Monterrey in Monterrey and in Palacio de los Deportes in Mexico City. She also appeared in the Reventour, a series of concerts in several places in Mexico, both as a singer and as a host.

In late July, she was part of an American tour with LU and Motel and announced the release of her first album in August in the United States, which she promoted extensively. She was also invited to participate in Hoy No Me Puedo Levantar, the Mexican musical based on the career and songs of the Spanish pop group Mecano.

She was nominated for Best New Artist in the Premios Oye!, the Mexican equivalent of the Grammys. She participated in El Show de los Sueños from September 30 to October 19, 2008, finishing in fourth place. In the first show, along with her counterpart Thalía, she sang "Tocando Fondo". In the following show the two sang "Te Aprovechas".  In the third show they sang "No me quedas mas" and in the fourth show they sang "Quererte a ti".  In the fifth show "Amores Extranos" followed by the sixth show with "Amiga Mia".

On February 6, 2010, a member of the San Francisco Board of Supervisors proclaimed February 6 as "Maria Jose Day" during her club performance in the city.

2007-2008: First album María José 
In 2007, her first solo album, Maria Jose, was announced and the first single "Quien Eres Tu?", featuring Trey Songz and of dance and hip-hop influences, started to pick up airplay in Mexico.

Two weeks after the release date, the album reached number 84. 
This song has also appeared on iTunes as a free single during the week of January 11, 2008.

She has said in various interviews that she expects the second single to be "Mas de ti" or "Habla menos".  "Me Equivoque", another track from the album, has garnered major digital sales in Mexico.

In late August, "Me Equivoque", along with its video, was released. "¿Donde Esta?", the third and final single of the album, was officially released in April 2008. The song's video was filmed in Mexico City at Estudios Churubusco. Twenty fans, who were chosen after winning a contest, were invited to attend the filming.

Josa announced on April 18, 2008, that she had officially left Warner Music. No explanation was given, but her third single was released as an independent artist and not with the help of Warner Music.

2009-2011: Amante de lo Ajeno and Amante de lo Bueno 
Promotion of her second album began with a short performance as the opening act of Rihanna's Disturbia tour in Mexico City on January 24, 2009. She premiered the song "No soy una señora" during the show.

Amante de lo ajeno was released on May 12, 2009. It consists of 11 songs that had been hits by pop divas in the 1980s.

"No soy una señora" was launched as the first single on March 2, and has become very popular in Mexico especially among teenagers.
The follow-up singles were "Mi Amor, Amor" and "Adelante Corazón", both of which experienced success in Mexican charts. The fourth single was planned to be "Sola No, Yo No Se Estar", but was scrapped due to the release of her third album.

María José released her third album, Amante de lo Bueno, on November 9, 2010. It is another compilation of hits from the 1980s. The first single, "La Ocasión Para Amarnos", was released in October. The single became another huge success in Mexico.

2012-2018: De Noche and Habla Ahora 
María José released her fourth album, De Noche worldwide on iTunes on August 15, 2012. It is her second album with all new songs. The first single, "Tú Ya Sabes a Mí", was released in June 2012. "Extraña" was released as a single in Spain.

María José released her fifth album, Habla Ahora worldwide on iTunes on October 21, 2016. It is her third album to feature original content. The first single, "Las Que Se Ponen Bien La Falda", featuring Puerto Rican rapper Ivy Queen, was released on May 13, 2016. The title track "Habla Ahora" was released as the second single from the album preceding the release of the album.

2019-present: Live Album Conexión, Esta historia me suena and La Voz 
In 2019, María José released live album Conexión. It was released on June 7, 2019, by OCESA Seitrack. The album was recorded in front of a selected audience to attend the concert located in Mexico City. In celebration of the tenth anniversary of her breakout album Amante de lo Ajeno, the album celebrates José's trajectory as a solo artist. The album includes material from her past five studio albums as well as 8 newly recorded songs. Featured guest include Ha*Ash, Yuri, Carlos Rivera and Vanesa Martin. In 2019, María José became judge of TV Azteca's México tiene talento and also became host of Televisa's new drama series Esta historia me suena alongside Jen Carlo Bautista, in which she also appeared as actress on a few episodes. On January 21, 2020, it was announced that María José would return to TV Azteca, but this time as a coach of La Voz alongside Ricardo Montaner, Belinda and Christian Nodal. She later returned for her second and final season in 2021 alongside Miguel Bosé, Edith Marquez, and Jesús Navarro.

Influences 
María José has declared many times that a few of her major influences are Mariah Carey, Rocío Dúrcal, Mecano, Moenia, Celine Dion, Christina Aguilera, Madonna, Eugenia León and Boyz II Men.

Discography

With Kabah

Solo artist

Studio albums

Live albums

Singles

As lead artist

Promotional singles

As featured artist

Filmography

References

External links 
 María José Oficial
 María José at Sei Track Musica

1976 births
Living people
Singers from Mexico City
21st-century Mexican singers
21st-century Mexican women singers